Mechanicsville is an unincorporated community and census-designated place (CDP) in the southern part of the town of Thompson in Windham County, Connecticut, United States. It is bordered to the north by North Grosvenor Dale and to the south by Putnam. Connecticut Route 12 (Riverside Drive) runs the length of the community, along the east side of the French River.

Mechanicsville was first listed as a CDP prior to the 2020 census.

A portion of the Air Line State Park Trail passes through Mechanicsville, along with the Providence and Worcester Railroad.

References 

Census-designated places in Windham County, Connecticut
Census-designated places in Connecticut